Etterby is a former village in Cumbria, England. It is now a northwestern suburb of Carlisle, on the northern side of the River Eden. The Redfern Inn (1939–1940) was designed by the architect Harry Redfern in the New Model Inn style. In 1870-72 the township had a population of 319.

References

External links
  Cumbria County History Trust: Stanwix (nb: provisional research only - see Talk page)

Areas of Carlisle, Cumbria